The Tom Show is an American sitcom television series that aired on The WB on Sunday nights from September 7, 1997, to February 22, 1998.

Premise
The series focused on Tom Amross, a TV producer who moved back to his home town of St. Paul, Minnesota, with his two young daughters following his divorce from his talk show host wife, who got a job producing his friend’s long running local morning talk show Breakfast With Charlie.

Cast
 Tom Arnold as Tom Amross
 Ed McMahon as Charlie
 Shawnee Smith as Florence Madison
 Michael Rosenbaum as Jonathan
 Lisa Wilhoit as Kenlon Amross
 Mika Boorem as Elissa Amross
 Shannon Tweed as Maggie Amross
 Tasha Smith as Tanya Cole

Episodes

References

External links
 

1997 American television series debuts
1998 American television series endings
The WB original programming
1990s American sitcoms
English-language television shows
Television shows set in Minnesota
Television series by Universal Television